This is a list of flag bearers who have represented Burkina Faso at the Olympics.

Flag bearers carry the national flag of their country at the opening ceremony of the Olympic Games.

See also
Burkina Faso at the Olympics

References

Burkina Faso at the Olympics
Burkina Faso
Olympic